New Germany can refer to:

Locations
 New Germany, KwaZulu-Natal, South Africa
 New Germany, Minnesota, United States
 New Germany, Nova Scotia, Canada
 New Germany State Park, Maryland, United States
 New Germany, Ohio, United States

See also
Neues Deutschland (New Germany), German newspaper
Das Neue Deutschland (The New Germany), World War II propaganda
Nueva Germania, a district in Paraguay